Marinko Jurendić (born 24 November 1977) is a Swiss retired footballer and coach with Bosnian-Croatian roots.

He was named manager of Aarau in June 2017.
Since 2020 he is the sporting director of FC Zürich.

References

External links
 

1977 births
Living people
Place of birth missing (living people)
Croatian emigrants to Switzerland
Association football forwards
Croatian footballers
FC Thun players
FC Winterthur players
FC Grenchen players
SC Kriens players
FC Luzern players
SC Cham players
Swiss Challenge League players
Croatian expatriate footballers
Expatriate footballers in Switzerland
Croatian expatriate sportspeople in Switzerland
Croatian football managers
SC Kriens managers
FC Aarau managers
FC Zürich non-playing staff